Metal Black is the eleventh studio album by heavy metal band Venom. It was released in 2006 through Castle/Sanctuary. It is the last to feature Mykvs on guitar. The name of the album is a play on their 1982 album Black Metal, one of the band's best known LPs.

Track listing

Credits
Cronos – bass, vocals
 Mykvs – guitar
Antton – drums

References

2006 albums
Venom (band) albums
Sanctuary Records albums